The Canton of Saint-Chinian is a former subdivision of the French department of Hérault, and its subdivision, the Arrondissement of Béziers. It had 8,138 inhabitants (2012). It was disbanded following the French canton reorganisation which came into effect in March 2015. It consisted of 13 communes, which joined the canton of Saint-Pons-de-Thomières in 2015.

Municipalities
The canton comprised the following communes:

 Agel
 Aigues-Vives
 Assignan
 Babeau-Bouldoux
 Cazedarnes
 Cébazan
 Cessenon-sur-Orb
 Cruzy
 Montouliers
 Pierrerue
 Prades-sur-Vernazobre
 Saint-Chinian
 Villespassans

References

Saint-Chinian
2015 disestablishments in France
States and territories disestablished in 2015